Terra Brasil is a Brazilian travel documentary television series that premiered on Animal Planet in Brazil on April 3, 2017. The series follows the agronomist Aruay Goldschmidt, botanist Anderson Santos and chef Mayra Abbondanza in their visits to preserved areas in several regions of Brazil,  revealing the country's natural wonders under the peculiar perspectives of each of the presenters.

Episodes

Season 1

Release
Terra Brasil began airing on April 3, 2017, on Animal Planet in Brazil. The series has been licensed to streaming services including Netflix, Amazon Prime Video and Looke.

References

External links 
 

2017 Brazilian television series debuts
2010s Brazilian documentary television series
Brazilian documentary television series
Brazilian travel television series
Portuguese-language television shows
Television shows filmed in Minas Gerais
Television shows filmed in Paraná
Television shows filmed in São Paulo (state)